Sergei Nikolaevich Sorokin (born October 2, 1969, in Gorky, Soviet Union) is a retired ice hockey player who played in the Soviet Hockey League.  He played for Torpedo Gorky and HC Dynamo Moscow.  He was inducted into the Russian and Soviet Hockey Hall of Fame in 1993.

Career statistics

Regular season and playoffs

International

External links
 
 Russian and Soviet Hockey Hall of Fame bio

1969 births
Avangard Omsk players
Düsseldorfer EG players
EK Zell am See players
Hannover Scorpions players
HC Dynamo Moscow players
HC Khimik Voskresensk players
Ice hockey players at the 1994 Winter Olympics
Living people
Moncton Hawks players
Olympic ice hockey players of Russia
Sportspeople from Nizhny Novgorod
Russian ice hockey defencemen
Soviet ice hockey defencemen
Torpedo Nizhny Novgorod players
Winnipeg Jets (1979–1996) draft picks